Halsell is a surname. Notable people with the surname include:

Grace Halsell (1923–2000), American journalist and writer
Harry H. Halsell (Harry Hurrinden Halsell) (1860–1957), American cattle rancher and writer in North Texas and Oklahoma
James D. Halsell (born 1956), retired United States Air Force officer and a former NASA astronaut
John Edward Halsell (1826–1899), U.S. Representative from Kentucky

See also
Lou Halsell Rodenberger (1926–2009), Texas author, educator, professor, and journalist
Halsell, Texas, unincorporated community 10 miles southwest of Henrietta in west central Clay County, Texas, United States
Halsall (disambiguation)